Taeniamia fucata, commonly known as the orange-lined- or painted cardinalfish, is a marine fish native to reefs from northern Australia and New Guinea, across the Indian Ocean to the east coast of Africa, and Pacific Ocean to Marshall Islands, Samoa, Tonga, and the Ryukyu Islands. 
It was known as Archamia fucata until 2013. FishBase treats T. sansibaricus as synonymous with T. fucata. but T. sansibaricus is recognised as valid by the Catalog of Fishes:

References

External links
 

fucata
Fish described in 1849